Stare Dębno  (German Damen) is a village in the administrative district of Gmina Tychowo, within Białogard County, West Pomeranian Voivodeship, in north-western Poland.

The village has a population of 220.

References

Villages in Białogard County